Sympistis babi is a moth of the family Noctuidae first described by James T. Troubridge in 2008.

Adults are on wing from June to early July.

References

babi
Moths described in 2008